Sam Crane (born 1979) is an English actor. He attended Oxford University and LAMDA, where he won the Nicholas Hytner Award. He played Farinelli in Claire van Kampen's Farinelli and the King opposite Mark Rylance at the Sam Wanamaker Playhouse and reprised his role when the production transferred first to the Duke of York's Theatre and then to the Belasco Theatre on Broadway. He is also known for playing Winston Smith in Headlong's production of 1984 in the West End, Fred Walters in the BBC's six-part drama series Desperate Romantics and Frederick Abberline in Ubisoft's Assassin's Creed Syndicate. In 2017 he played Patrick Plunket in an episode of the Netflix series The Crown. Since 13th October 2022 Sam has been playing the lead, Harry Potter, in Harry Potter and the Cursed Child at the Palace Theatre, London.

Background
Crane is the son Richard Crane, a playwright, and theatre director Faynia Williams. He studied at Oxford University, and LAMDA. He is married to filmmaker Pinny Grylls and they have a young son and daughter.

Selected credits
The Crown (2017) as Patrick Plunket
Farinelli and the King (2015-2018), Shakespeare's Globe, West End and Broadway)
1984 (2014, West End) as Winston Smith
Eternal Love (2014, ETT) as Bernard of Clairvaux
The Humans (2013, BAM New York) as Tophole
The Christmas Candle (2013) as Thomas Haddington
Father Brown "The Mayor and the Magician" (2013) as William Knight
New Tricks "Old School Ties" (2012) as Oliver Lebbon
Casualty "Place of Safety" (2011) as Jim
Bedlam (2010, Shakespeare's Globe) as Laurence
Henry IV Part I & II (2010, Shakespeare's Globe) as Hotspur and Pistol
Desperate Romantics (2009, TV series) as Fred Walters
...some trace of her (2008, NT)
The Odyssey (2008, National Theatre)
DNA/ The Miracle (2008, NT) as Phil/ Mr Rodgers
Kebab (2007, Royal Court Theatre) as Bogdan
Othello (2007, Shakespeare's Globe) as Roderigo
Ghosts (2007, Bristol Old Vic) as Oswald
Carrie's War (2006-7, Lillian Bayliss Theatre) as Albert
Midnight Cowboy (2006, Edinburgh Festival)
The Pretenders (2006, radio)
Silverland (2006, Arcola) as Mikey
And Then There Were None (2005-6, Gielgud Theatre) as Anthony
Major Barbara (2004, Royal Exchange Theatre)
Rabbit (2003, UK tour) as Spin
Midsomer Murders "Murder on St. Malley's Day" (2002, TV) as Daniel Talbot
A Little Requiem for Kantor (ICA/ SESC São Paulo)
Harry Potter and the Cursed Child (2022 Palace Theatre, London) as Harry Potter

References

External links

Interview in The Oxford Mail
Short profile from in New York Magazine
The British Theatre Guide's review of Ghosts
Michael Billington's review of Ghosts in The Guardian
Brief encounter with Sam Crane in whatsonstage.com
 "Desperate Romantics"

English male child actors
English male stage actors
English male television actors
English male radio actors
English male Shakespearean actors
Alumni of the London Academy of Music and Dramatic Art
Alumni of the University of Oxford
1979 births
Living people